Frigate navy is a term describing a nation state's navy that is made of mostly frigates or destroyers as a major combat force.  This navy would thus be lacking large vessels such as cruisers, a significant number of effective submarines, or aircraft carriers, but it would also be more effective and deployable than a navy that just maintains corvettes or gunboats.  A frigate navy can be a green water navy or a brown water navy, depending on how logistics are structured.  The Royal Netherlands Navy is an example of a frigate navy, as was the U.S. Navy in the War of 1812.

External links 
Jefferson's Gunboat Navy, 1805-1812
Navies by type